Uppsala University Hospital (often referred to colloquially as "Akademiska" or "Ackis") in Uppsala, Sweden, is a teaching hospital for the Uppsala University Faculty of Medicine and the Nursing School. Uppsala University Hospital is owned and operated by the Uppsala County Council in cooperation with the university and serves, together with Enköping hospital in Enköping, as the primary hospitals for Uppsala County. It also fills the function of a tertiary referral hospital for the Uppsala/Örebro health care region and, for certain specialities, a tertiary referral hospital for the entire country of Sweden.

History 

The university hospital has its origins in two older hospitals: one was founded in 1302 and is older than the university, the other one was founded for the Faculty of Medicine in 1708. These were merged in 1850.

The earliest hospital in Uppsala was founded in 1302. This was used for 400 years until the great fire of 1702, which destroyed large parts of central Uppsala. A new hospital, which later became the Uppsala county hospital, was built in its place, but was moved out of the town in 1811.

The university hospital as such was founded in 1708 as the first clinic with the specific intention of facilitating the practical education of medical students. Known as the Nosocomium Academicum, it was located in the Oxenstierna Palace at Riddartorget, beside the cathedral (see illustration). The building (the former residence of the President of the Royal Chancellery Bengt Gabrielsson Oxenstierna) today houses the Uppsala University Faculty of Law.

The present Akademiska sjukhuset was established in 1850 as an organizational merger of the county hospital and the university clinic, and a new building was inaugurated in 1867 on the hill below Uppsala Castle to the southeast. From this building, which is still in use, the present hospital complex has grown.

In 1663 medical professor and amateur architect Olaus Rudbeck designed the anatomical theatre located in the Gustavianum, which at the time served as the main building of Uppsala University. Rudbeck had spent some time at Leiden University, and both the anatomical theatre and the Uppsala University Botanical Garden he founded in Uppsala in 1655 were influenced by his experiences. Today Gustavianum is still in use for lectures and conferences, and also hosts a museum, Museum Gustavianum, open to visitors.

Facilities 
, the hospital has around 8,300 employees and 940 beds.

In addition, the hospital also has: 
several business entities, including:
an ATM
cafeterias, kiosks, restaurants and shops
a pharmacy (Apoteket)
a 40-bed hotel for patients and relatives
a chaplaincy (staffed by the Church of Sweden)
a hospital library which serves as a public library

Organization 
The present hospital director is Lennart Persson, and the medical directors are Margareta Öhrvall, M.D. and Bengt Sandén, M.D.

Divisions 
The following are divisions under the hospital director:
 Diagnostics, Anesthesia and Technology Division
 Emergency and Rehabilitation Division
 Oncology, Thorax and Medical Division
 Neurology Division
 Psychiatry Division
 Surgery Division
 Women's Health and Pediatrics Division

Departments 

Specialities
Anaesthesiology and Main Operating Theatres
Antenatal Centre
Audiology
Burn Unit
Cardiology
Clinical Physiology
Centre for Gynecology and Obstetrics
Centre for Laboratory Medicine
Uppsala University Children's Hospital
Clinical genetics
International Child Health Care
Pediatric Medicine
Paediatric Oncology
Pediatric Orthopaedics
Pediatric Surgery
Clinical Chemistry
Clinical Microbiology
Clinical Pathology
Clinical Pharmacology
Dermatology and Venereology
Endocrinology and Diabetes Care
Emergency Department
Endocrine oncology
ENT (Ear, Nose, Throat)
General Internal Medicine
Geriatrics
Gastroenterology
Haematology
Hepatology
Hospital Physics
Immunology and Transfusion Medicine
Infectious Diseases
Lung Medicine
National Centre for Battered and Raped Women
Nephrology
Neurology
Neurophysiology
Neurosurgery
Occupational and Environmental Medicine
Occupational Therapy
Oncology
Ophthalmology
Orthopaedics
Phoniatrics
Physiotherapy
Psychiatry
Adult Psychiatry
Geriatric Psychiatry
Pediatric and Adolescent Psychiatry
Radiology
Rehabilitation
Reproduction Centre
Rheumatology
Social Medicine
Surgery
Otosurgery
Plastic Surgery
Thoracic Anaesthesiology
Thoracic Surgery
Transplantation Surgery
Toxicomania
Urology
Specialized Centres
Centre for Clinical Medical Research
Centre for Eating Disorders
Centre for Cystic Fibrosis
Centre for Down's Syndrome
Uppsala Centre of Excellence in Aorta
Uppsala Centre of Excellence in Neuroendocrine Tumors
National Centre for Battered and Raped Women
Pain Centre
Trauma Centre
Wound Centre

Svedberg Laboratory
The Svedberg Laboratory is a university facility that contains the Gustaf Werner cyclotron, which is used for research as well as for proton therapy for the treatment of cancer with close cooperation with the oncology clinic at Uppsala University Hospital. Such an accelerator and its gantries costs between $60 million and $100 million, and makes Uppsala University Hospital one of the approximately 40 centers in the word to provide such cancer treatment.

Uppsala University Children's Hospital 
Uppsala University Children's Hospital was formed in 1991 with the merger of the departments of paediatrics, paediatric surgery, paediatric orthopaedic surgery and clinical genetics. The children's hospital also has a Paediatric Oncology department with 14 beds and a rehabilitation centre called the Folke Bernadotte Home with 20 beds.

Uppsala Centre of Excellence in Neuroendocrine Tumors 
Since the 1970s, there has been a special emphasis on endocrine tumors at Uppsala University Hospital. The department of Endocrine oncology has been seeing and treating about 3000 patients with endocrine tumors, making it the largest of the six centers of excellence recognized by the European Neuroendocrine Tumor Society (ENETS).

Mobile Intensive Care Units

Helicopter Borne Intensive Care Unit
Uppsala University Hospital also has a helicopter borne intensive care unit. The current equipment is a Eurocopter Dauphin N3 equipped as a one-bed intensive care unit (2010). The helicopter is crewed by two IFR licensed pilots, with medical personnel consisting of a doctor and a nurse both specializing in intensive care and anesthesia. Crew members in other specialities are brought along, as needed by the mission. The helicopter is mainly used for transports between hospitals in Sweden and Finland but also serves the Uppsala County area with helicopter emergency medical care within a range of 100 km from the hospital.

Fixed Wing Intensive Care Unit
In addition to the short range mobile intensive care provided by the helicopter, Uppsala University Hospital owns a Bombardier Learjet 45. The aircraft is equipped by LifePort and capable of providing long range intensive care transports of up to two patients on stretchers or in incubators. The plane is crewed by two pilots and medical personnel in appropriate specialities for the mission.

Education 
Uppsala University Hospital provides a major part of the medical education (organized by the Uppsala University Faculty of Medicine) and nurse training in Uppsala.

Uppsala Care 
Uppsala University Hospital also offers its services to foreign citizens (non-swedes) under the service organization called "Uppsala Care". Specialities which are offered to foreigners include:
 Endocrine oncology
 Clinic for Internal Medicine, diabetes and other endocrine disorders, haematology, hepatology
 Gynecological endocrinology and infertility
 Immune deficiency diseases
 Neuro Centre, neurology, neurophysiology
 Neurosurgery, occupational therapy, rehabilitation
 Prosthesis
 Rehabilitation of spinal cord injuries
 Surgical treatment and radio therapy for cancer
 Thoracic Centre, invasive cardiology including angioplasty and arrhythmia ablation, thoracic and lung surgery
 Transplantation (bone marrow, liver, kidney, pancreas)
 Urology diseases
 Vascular surgery

References

External links 

Uppsala University Hospital
Official website, Alternate website address 
Official website in English 
Uppsala University Faculty of Medicine
Uppsala University Faculty of Medicine 
Uppsala University Faculty of Medicine website in English 
Uppsala County
Uppsala County official website 
Uppsala County official website in English 

Teaching hospitals in Sweden
Uppsala University
Hospitals established in the 14th century
Hospitals established in the 1700s
Hospitals established in 1850
1302 establishments in Europe
14th-century establishments in Sweden
Buildings and structures in Uppsala